Afrique Airlines was an airline based in Cotonou, Benin. It was established in 2002 and operated scheduled passenger service between Benin and Paris in France out of Cadjehoun Airport until the end of 2003. In 2006, the company was officially dissolved.

Fleet 
Afrique Airlines operated one Airbus A310-300, which was leased from Eagle Aviation France.

References

Defunct airlines of Benin
Airlines established in 2003
Airlines established in 2006
2002 establishments in Benin
2006 disestablishments in Benin
Companies based in Cotonou